Andreas Hönisch  (3 October 1930 – 25 January 2008) was the founder and Superior General of Servi Jesu et Mariae, and co-founder of the Katholische Pfadfinderschaft Europas.

Biography
Hönisch founded the new order of the Servi Jesu et Mariae (SJM, Servants of Jesus and Mary) in 1988. That same year, he was expelled by the Jesuits due to his traditional views of the Catholic doctrine and pedagogy. The first members of the order came from the Catholic Scouts of Europe founded by Hönisch. The SJM were recognized as a Congregation of Papal Right in 1994. The congregation runs a boarding school in northern Germany and is engaged in the Pastoral care of the Katholische Pfadfinderschaft Euro
Hönisch died on 25 January 2008 in Blindenmarkt, Lower Austria.

References

External links
http://thenewliturgicalmovement.blogspot.com/2008/01/fr-andreas-hnisch-sjm.html

1930 births
2008 deaths
People from Bystrzyca Kłodzka
20th-century German Jesuits
Founders of Catholic religious communities
Former Jesuits
People associated with Scouting
Scouting and Guiding in Germany
German traditionalist Catholics